The Cameroon Tribune is a major newspaper in Cameroon. It is also available online. It is owned by the government. It was founded in 1974 by the Societé de Presse et d'Editions du Cameroun (SOPECAM). The French version became the only daily newspaper in the country.

See also 
 Media of Cameroon

References

External links
 Cameroon Tribunes Official Website

Newspapers published in Cameroon
Publications with year of establishment missing